David Liam McCormack (born October 25, 1968) is an Australian musician, singer-songwriter, and actor. He is best known as the frontman of the Brisbane-based rock group Custard,
and for voicing the character Bandit in the animated children's series Bluey.

Early groups
McCormack grew up in the west Brisbane suburb of Kenmore, Queensland, and attended Ipswich Grammar School. He started his musical career as a vocalist and guitarist in Brisbane blues hip hop rock outfit, Who's Gerald?, in 1986, which included school teachers Paul Medew on bass guitar and Glen Donald on keyboards, they recruited Cathy Atthow on drums. They released a cassette, Who's Gerald's Greatest Hits in the same year on their own Gerald Corp Records. In March 1988 they released a single, "Wrestle Wrestle" and had the track, "Pins and Needles" on that year's Youngblood compilation. Atthow, McCormack and Medew briefly formed Automatic Graphic in 1988 with Scott Younger.

Custard

In 1989, McCormack and Medew formed Custard Gun with Shane Brunn (later in Hugbubble, Vanlustbader) on drums and James Straker (later in Melniks). After a number of performances, Straker left in early 1990, the band was renamed as Custard, and Straker was replaced at year's end by Matthew Strong on guitar.

Custard existed for about a decade, with a number of different drummers including Gavin Herrenberg, Danny Plant, John Lowry and Glenn Thompson (later of The Go-Betweens). The band released five studio albums in the 1990s: Buttercup/Bedford, Wahooti Fandango, Wisenheimer, We Have the Technology and Loverama, a number of EPs and singles and a greatest hits compilation entitled Goodbye Cruel World. A DVD video clip compilation called The Spaces by the Side of the Road – A Digital History of Custard was released in 2007.

Custard released a new album in November 2015, entitled Come Back, All Is Forgiven, which was followed by 2017's The Common Touch.

The single 'Funky Again' was released in March 2020, ahead of the band's eighth studio album Respect All Lifeforms.

Other 1990s bands
McCormack was moonlighting in other bands during the 1990s, which formed in and around Custard's practice rooms. The Cows from 1993 (later styled as COW or C.O.W. – for Country Or Western) had Thompson and Robert Moore on bass guitar; as well as Maureen Hansen on vocals, Susie Hansen on vocals and Mark Lowry (twin brother of John Lowry) on bass guitar by 1995. COW released Beard in June 1996. In 2006, McCormack and Moore collaborated on a new COW single called "The Chicken Dance" with Rob Hirst of Midnight Oil on drums.

McCormack, Moore and Thompson recorded with Robert Forster (ex-The Go-Betweens) for his second solo album, Calling from a Country Phone, released in 1993 and toured with Forster as Silver Backwash. Frank 'n' Stein from 1995 had Moore and McCormack join with his brother Dylan McCormack (ex-Biro) and Ian Wadley. Miami, also from 1995, had Maureen Hansen (also in COW and McCormack's then girlfriend), Nick Naughton on drums and Medew. Miami released two CDs: Costume of Sand (March 1997) and Feel the Seed (1998). Computor was another collaboration between McCormack and Moore, which was electronic sounding and released a tape called Floppy Disk.

The Modern Day Lover 
After the break-up of Custard in 2000, McCormack formed The Titanics with Emma Tom (newspaper journalist for The Australian) and Thompson and film-maker, Tina Havelock Stevens. The Titanics released Size Isn't Everything (2000) and Love Is The Devil (September 2000).

Following the break-up of The Titanics McCormack went solo, releasing a CD of electronic doodlings called The Matterhorn (2001) then recruited a backing band called The Polaroids. David McCormack and The Polaroids have released two albums, Candy (2002) and The Truth About Love (2004) as well as a few singles and a DVD entitled Save Dave.

McCormack was one of the two weekly 'mystery' guests on the Australian television show RocKwiz on SBS One in March 2006. He later appeared as the guest host of RocKwiz in January 2009.

In November 2006, under the guidance of JJJ, McCormack assembled a band to perform a concert at the Tivoli in Brisbane as a tribute for the late Grant McLennan of The Go-Betweens. Early in 2007, McCormack then went into the studio to produce a tribute album to the band, called Write Your Adventures Down (released on Sony BMG). He also recorded a cover version of Streets of Your Town for the film All My Friends Are Leaving Brisbane.

In October 2009, McCormack released Little Murders containing 20 tracks and running for almost an hour. The name comes from a 1969 film.

McCormack is a part owner of the Sonar Music composer collective and since 2009 has been responsible for many film and television scores including The Tall Man, Rake, Redfern Now, House Husbands, Wild Boys, and Blood Brothers. Additionally, McCormack has also composed film scores for Alex Proyas's Garage Days in 2002, and for Daniel Krige's West in 2006.

Custard reformed for a concert on 10 December 2009, as part of the Queensland Proclamation Day, 150th Anniversary Celebrations. The band released a new album Come Back, All Is Forgiven in November 2015, and the critically acclaimed The Common Touch in 2017.

Bluey 
Since 2018, McCormack has starred in the critically acclaimed ABC Kids animated television series Bluey, as the voice of the titular character's father, Bandit Heeler.

Awards and nominations

ARIA Music Awards
The ARIA Music Awards is an annual awards ceremony that recognises excellence, innovation, and achievement across all genres of Australian music. They commenced in 1987. 

! 
|-
| 1999
| Andrew Lancaster and David McCormack for "Girls Like That (Don't Go For Guys Like Us)" by Custard
|Best Video
| 
|  
|-

References

Sources
 
  Note: Archived [on-line] copy has limited functionality.
  Note: [on-line] version established at White Room Electronic Publishing Pty Ltd in 2007 and was expanded from the 2002 edition.

External links
 Official site
 David McCormack on IMDB
 Custard's Official site
 The Titanics Official site

1968 births
Living people
APRA Award winners
Australian male singers
Australian male voice actors
Australian musicians
People from Brisbane